Majdal Selem, or Mejdel Islim and Majdal Zun,     is a village the  Marjeyoun District in Southern Lebanon.

Name
According to E. H. Palmer, the name Mejdel Islim means Islim’s watch-tower, p.n.

Majdel Selem means Fortress of Peace, or Peace Fortress.

History
In 1596, it was named as a village,  Majdal Salim, in the Ottoman nahiya (subdistrict) of  Tibnin  under the Liwa Safad, with a population of  51  households and 8 bachelors, all Muslim. The villagers paid a  fixed tax-rate of 25 % on  agricultural products, such as wheat, barley, olive trees, fruit trees, vegetable and fruit garden, orchard, goats, beehives, in addition to "occasional revenues" and a press for olive oil or grape syrup; a total of 9,110 akçe.

In 1875 Victor Guérin found that the village had about  300  Metawileh inhabitants. He further noted: "A mosque, now abandoned and falling into ruins, has succeeded here a Byzantine church, the materials of which have been used in building it. Over one of the windows is a stone (apparently once the lintel) with an old Greek inscription, the characters of which are too much defaced to be read. A monolithic column lies beside it, half buried in the ground, surmounted  by a capital sculptured in form of open basket work."

In 1881, the PEF's Survey of Western Palestine (SWP)  described it as a "large village, built of stone, of ancient appearance, containing about 500 [..] Metawileh [..]. Situated on table land, surrounded by olives and arable land. Water supply from a large masonry birket and many cisterns." They further noted: "Village containing several good lintels and remains of ruins; an ancient road leads from the village to the Birkeh."

On 15 February 1993 the village was attacked by Israeli helicopter gunships following an attack on SLA positions earlier in the day. During the 1996 Israeli seventeen day bombardment of south Lebanon the Nepalese UNIFIL position in Majdel Selm was hit by eight shells and extensively damaged.

On 5 December 1997 three civilians were killed by a roadside bomb. The bomb was believed to have been planted by an Israeli commando special unit. Including this event forty-three civilians had been killed in southern Lebanon in 1997

References

Bibliography

External links
   Majdal Selem, MajdalSelem.org
   Majdel Selm, Localiban
Survey of Western Palestine, Map 2:   IAA, Wikimedia commons

Populated places in the Israeli security zone 1985–2000
Populated places in Marjeyoun District
Shia Muslim communities in Lebanon